Guzan-e Fars (also Romanized as Gūzan-e Fārs; also known as Kūzan) is a village in Qoroq Rural District, Baharan District, Gorgan County, Golestan Province, Iran. At the 2006 census, its population was 1,178, in 310 families.

References 

Populated places in Gorgan County